, known in English as Class Relations, in French as , is a 1984 film by the French filmmaking duo of Jean-Marie Straub and Danièle Huillet. It is based on Franz Kafka's unfinished first novel, Amerika.

The German filmmaker Harun Farocki appears as one of the leads, and the film also features a cameo from American experimental filmmaker Thom Andersen.

Farocki made a documentary about the filming process, .

Cast
 Christian Heinisch as Karl Roßmann
 Nazzareno Bianconi as Giacomo
 Mario Adorf as Onkel
 Laura Betti as Brunelda
 Harun Farocki as Delamarche
 Manfred Blank as Robinson
  as Heizer
 Anna Schnell as Line
 Klaus Traube as Kapitän
 Georg Brintrup as Student
 Hermann Hartmann as Oberkassierer
 Gérard Semaan as Schubal
 Jean-François Quinque as Stewart
 Villi Vöbel as Pollunder

Style
As Franz Kafka never visited the United States, the film was intentionally shot in Europe, with the bulk of shooting occurring in Germany. The film features prominently architecture, flora and costuming (including a policeman in a bobby helmet) that is unlikely to be found in the United States. Only a handful of shots were shot on location in the United States, including the Statue of Liberty and the Missouri River.  Though Huillet and Straub are both French, the film was shot in German, the book's original language.

The film was shot on black-and-white 35mm Kodak film stock by French cinematographer William Lubtchansky. Like all other Straub-Huillet films, it only uses location sound recorded at the same time as the image, emphasizing cinema's documentary nature over the pictorial.

Awards
The film was entered into the 34th Berlin International Film Festival where it won an Honourable Mention.

References

External links
 

1984 films
1980s avant-garde and experimental films
1980s historical drama films
1984 independent films
1980s business films
Films about cities
Films about education
Films about social class
Films based on works by Franz Kafka
Films based on Austrian novels
Films directed by Jean-Marie Straub and Danièle Huillet
Films set in department stores
Films set in New York City
Films set in the 1920s
Films set on ships
Films shot in New York City
French avant-garde and experimental films
French black-and-white films
French historical drama films
French independent films
German avant-garde and experimental films
German black-and-white films
German historical drama films
German independent films
1980s drama road movies
German drama road movies

West German films
1980s German-language films
1980s French films
1980s German films